MIL-STD-1777 is a document written by the now defunct Defense Communications Agency (replaced by DISA) and which preceded 2 years of comments on RFC 791. It was written in 1983 as a protocol oriented document, whose descendant is the modern Internet. Its predecessor defined the protocol for the somewhat successful, but short lived ARPANET. MIL-STD-1777 essentially says that various data-gram protocols should be adopted for internet communications and should be reliable and follow "standard practices". Interfaces and hardware were and continue to be developed using this defining document. Much work and 30+ years of dedicated engineering have now made MIL-STD-1777 and RFC 791 true icons in an era where communications are much used and little understood.

Defining text relates to the interconnecting of DoD Sub-nets;

"The Internet Protocol (IP) and the Transmission Control Protocol (TCP) are mandatory for use in all DoD packet switching networks which connect or have the potential for utilizing connectivity across network or subnetwork boundaries. Network elements (hosts, front-ends, bus interface units, gateways. etc.) within such networks which are to be used for internetting shall implement TCP/IP. The term network as used herein includes Local Area Networks (LANs) but not integrated weapon systems. Use of TCP/IP within LANs is strongly encouraged particularly where a need is perceived for equipment inter-manageability or network survivability. Use of TCP/IP in weapon systems is also encouraged where such usage does not diminish network performance."

References

External links 
 RFC 791

Military of the United States standards
Internet Protocol